Gamla Limhamn is a neighbourhood of Malmö, situated in the Borough of Limhamn-Bunkeflo, Malmö Municipality, Skåne County, Sweden.

References

Neighbourhoods of Malmö

sv:Gamla Limhamn